The Champlain Bridge was a steel truss cantilever bridge with approach viaducts constructed of prestressed concrete beams supporting a prestressed concrete deck paved with asphalt. The bridge crossed the Saint Lawrence River, connecting the Island of Montreal to its South Shore suburbs.

Opened in 1962, the structure was degraded by de-icing salt. The replacement bridge opened on 1 July 2019, and the old Champlain Bridge was closed to traffic, exactly 57 years after its opening. Demolition began in 2020. It will take four years, and may cost about $400 million.

Together with the Jacques Cartier Bridge, it was administered by the Jacques Cartier and Champlain Bridges Incorporated (JCCBI), a Canadian Crown Corporation which reports to Infrastructure Canada. Since December 21, 1978, JCCBI was responsible for the management, maintenance and monitoring of the Champlain Bridge.

The bridge saw about 50million crossings per year, of which 200,000 were buses. On an average weekday, 66% of users were commuters. It was the one of the busiest bridges in Canada upon its closure in 2019, Hogg's Hollow Bridge is the busiest overall.

Specifications
The Champlain Bridge project was undertaken in 1955 and construction proceeded between 1957 and 1962. The bridge carried six lanes of vehicle traffic; three in each direction. During rush hour one lane of those heading off the island in the morning, and onto the island in the evening, was used as a reserved bus lane for buses to be able to head in the opposite direction. The bridge was opened to traffic in stages as the approaches were completed between June 1962 and September 1964. It was subsequently connected to the Bonaventure Expressway, which was part of the north approach to the bridge. The expressway was opened to traffic on April 21, 1967. It was one of North America's busiest highways with almost 59million crossings annually.
Total length of crossing complex: 
Total bridge length including approaches: 
Length: abutment to abutment: 
Link of viaduct to Section 1: 
Center main cantilevered span: 
Wellington Street approach: 
Bonaventure Expressway: 

Just upstream from the bridge there is an ice boom, the Champlain Bridge Ice Control Structure.

Construction history

On August 17, 1955, Federal Transport Minister George Marler announced the planned construction of a new bridge connecting Montreal to the South Shore via Nun's Island. The city's existing bridges (Victoria, Cartier, and Mercier) had become inadequate to support the amount of traffic that carried residents from the growing South Shore suburbs into Montreal.

The project was initially called the Nuns' Island Bridge because it crosses Nuns' Island. In 1958, it was named the Champlain Bridge in honour of the explorer Samuel de Champlain.

The National Harbours Board was placed in charge of the project. Through several lengthy meetings and consultations in the fall of 1955, the location for the bridge and its approaches were selected. Originally, the plan had been to build the bridge with only 4 lanes, with room for further expansion to 6 lanes. During the design phase, however, it was decided to go with an initial 6-lane design.

It was opened on June 28, 1962 at 4 p.m. with only one approach from Montreal, via Wellington Street. A section including approaches to and from Atwater Street and La Vérendrye Boulevard were opened two years later.

In 1967, the final approach to the bridge on the Montréal side was completed when the Bonaventure Expressway was opened to traffic.

A $0.25 toll ($0.08 if paid with tokens) was charged to finance the $35million cost of the Champlain Bridge. The toll was collected until 1990, when the Jacques Cartier and Champlain Bridges Incorporated (JCCBI), which took over jurisdiction of the bridge a dozen years earlier, removed the toll plaza.

Structural health

Montreal's climate subjects the Champlain Bridge to wintry cold, snowfall, and windy conditions, as well as contrasting hot and humid summer conditions, all of which accelerate damage to the bridge. Because of the potential danger from ice accumulation during winter, the bridge was salted every season for decades. But salt attacks both the concrete and steel rebar used in girders, pylons, and other parts. The problems associated with the design and maintenance of the Champlain Bridge have thus advanced the useful life of several structural components. The design and construction of the structure prevents the isolation of outdated elements and their replacement with new ones, as can be done on other structures. Given the state of advanced deterioration of the bridge, it is constantly monitored by 300 sensors.

Several reinforcement measures and rehabilitation programs have been deployed over time by JCCBI.

In 1992, the concrete deck of the cantilever metal part was replaced by an orthotropic steel deck. Gutters to channel the corrosive runoff to the river appeared in 1994. The pressure exerted by the reinforced beams on the ends of the trimmers then required the reinforcement of the latter by steel rods under tension.

In 2009, the Government of Canada announced in its 2009 Economic Action Plan that it would be allocating $212million to renew the bridge. And in March 2011, the Government of Canada announced $158million would be spent on a major repair and maintenance program as concerns mount it is at risk of collapse. Montreal's La Presse newspaper cited two leaked engineering reports prepared for a federal bridge agency that suggest sections of the structure are in a severe state of deterioration that will progress exponentially. The report concludes that a partial or complete collapse of the span should not be ruled out.

Since 2009, JCCBI has been conducting a major repair program to extend the usefulness of the Champlain Bridge while ensuring the safety of users. The installation of sensors helps monitor the structure's behaviour day and night. This repair program was scheduled to be completed in 2018.

In 2010, JCCBI — the Federal agency that oversees the structure — retained international engineering firm Delcan to carry out an expert study of the bridge's structural health. The firm returned a report entitled, "The Future of the Champlain Bridge Crossing". In the Executive Summary, the bridge was said to be "functionally deficient" for both current and long-term traffic demands, and showing "significant deterioration". One finding suggested that the Champlain Bridge is in "very much poorer condition than would be typical" for comparable bridges. Delcan concluded that the bridge had "many deficiencies" and, even in light of the methodical inspection and rehabilitation of the structure undertaken by its owners, that continued operation "entails some risks that cannot altogether be quantified".

The CBC Television and Télévision de Radio-Canada, among other news agencies, have published segments highlighting concerns over conditions of surface roads in Montreal and the Champlain Bridge in particular.

In November 2013, a crack was discovered in a critical part of the superstructure. One lane was closed immediately and emergency repair plans were put in place. During preparation, the crack enlarged and a second lane was closed.

On November 29, 2013, a temporary external beam of 75 tons, named "super-beam" by the media, was urgently installed to reinforce the structure. In June 2014, JCCBI replaced the super-beam with first modular truss that was designed and manufactured in Quebec.

As part of a 2014–2017 Edge girder reinforcement program, 94 modular trusses and six shoring systems were installed to stabilize the condition of the bridge girders.

See also

 List of longest bridges in the world
 List of bridges
 List of crossings of the Saint Lawrence River
 List of bridges in Montreal
 Federal Bridge Corporation Limited
 Réseau express métropolitain

References

External links

New Champlain Bridge | project website
Steve Anderson's MontrealRoads.com: Champlain Bridge (A-10, A-15, and A-20)

1962 establishments in Quebec
2019 disestablishments in Quebec
Cantilever bridges in Canada
Bridges completed in 1962
Bridges in Montreal
Bridges over the Saint Lawrence River
Buildings and structures in Brossard
Former toll bridges in Canada
Le Sud-Ouest
Road bridges in Quebec
Roads with a reversible lane
Transport in Brossard
Verdun, Quebec